Jesse Piper (1836 – 21 April 1920) was a Nelson, New Zealand city councillor and mayor.

Early life
Piper was born in 1836 at Hastings, Sussex, England. He went to sea as a youth. On the outbreak of the Crimean War joined the storeship  and sailed to Malta. Later Piper served on the paddle steamer Cyclops, which took the 28th Regiment from Malta to Gallipoli. Piper was injured and discharged from the navy. He joined the merchant service until 1860.

He then became a storekeeper in Hastings until he migrated to New Zealand from London on 24 July 1872 on the ship Asterope arriving at Nelson on 19 October 1872. Piper settled in Nelson, and ran the YMCA hostel on the corner or Bridge and Collingwood Street until 1883, when he retired from business.

Politics

Local body
In 1890 Piper was elected to the City Council and in April 1904 was elected mayor. He lost the mayoralty in April 1905 to Henry Baigent. He stood again in 1906 and was re-elected until 1910. In the 1910 election he was defeated by Thomas Pettit.

Parliament
Joseph Shephard resigned on 15 April 1885 from the Waimea electorate when he was appointed to the Legislative Council. The resulting 1885 by-election, which was held on 3 June, was contested by six candidates: John Kerr (253 votes), W. N. Franklyn (250 votes), William White (94 votes), Christian Dencker (91 votes), W. Wastney (59 votes) and Jesse Piper (32 votes). Kerr was thus elected.

Piper unsuccessfully stood for Parliament in the City of Nelson electorate on several occasions.

Piper was noted as a man of firm convictions.

Community service 
Piper was a member of the Hospital Board for a time, a prominent member of the Recabite Order and interested in the temperance movement. He was a trustee of the local YMCA.
Piper was a Justice of the Peace (JP). He became a member of the Nelson Charitable Aid Board in 1890.
In May 1890, members of the Nelson Charitable Aid Board, including Piper, made a surprise visit to the Stoke Industrial School. The school, also called St. Mary's Orphanage, was a privately run, Roman Catholic, reform school. The inspectors found two boys locked in solitary confinement cells. This discovery and other matters lead to the tabling of The Royal Commission Report on Stoke Industrial School, Nelson. Piper testified under oath to the Royal Commission.

Death
Piper died at his Waimea Road residence in Nelson on 21 April 1920, aged 83, and was buried at Wakapuaka Cemetery. He was survived by his second wife.

References 

1836 births
1920 deaths
People from Hastings
Royal Navy personnel of the Crimean War
English emigrants to New Zealand
Mayors of Nelson, New Zealand
Unsuccessful candidates in the 1884 New Zealand general election
Unsuccessful candidates in the 1887 New Zealand general election
Unsuccessful candidates in the 1896 New Zealand general election
Burials at Wakapuaka Cemetery
19th-century New Zealand politicians